Ribero is a municipality of Sucre, Venezuela. The capital is Cariaco.

Municipalities of Sucre (state)